Hangin' Out may refer to:

 Hangin' Out (Funk, Inc. album)
 Hangin' Out (Joe Newman and Joe Wilder album)